Jamie Franks may refer to:

 Jamie Franks (politician) (born 1972), Democratic member of the Mississippi House of Representatives
 Jamie Franks (soccer) (born 1986), American soccer player
 Jamie Franks (professional shooter)

See also
James Franks (disambiguation)